Almirante Lynch-class destroyer may refer to one of the following ship classes of destroyers of the Chilean Navy:

 Almirante Lynch-class torpedo gunboat (1890), a two-ship class of torpedo gunboats; both ships were stricken in 1919
 Almirante Lynch-class destroyer (1912), a six-ship class of destroyers built in the United Kingdom for the Chilean Navy; only two were delivered before World War I; the surviving three of the other four, which had all been appropriated by the Royal Navy, were repurchased by Chile in 1920 and were classed as the Almirante Williams class

Destroyers of Chile